Hohe Börde is a municipality in the Börde district in Saxony-Anhalt, Germany. It was formed on 1 January 2010 by the merger of the former municipalities Ackendorf, Bebertal, Eichenbarleben, Groß Santersleben, Hermsdorf, Hohenwarsleben, Irxleben, Niederndodeleben, Nordgermersleben, Ochtmersleben, Schackensleben and Wellen. On 1 September 2010 it absorbed Bornstedt and Rottmersleben. These 14 former municipalities are now Ortschaften or municipal divisions of Hohe Börde.

References

 
Börde (district)